Taranis columbella is a species of sea snail, a marine gastropod mollusk in the family Raphitomidae.

Description
The length of the shell attains 4.6 mm, (0.18") its diameter 1.9 mm (0.075")

Distribution
The holotype of this marine species was found off Sheffield Beach, South Africa.

References

External links
 Kilburn, R. N. "Turridae (Mollusca: Gastropoda) of southern Africa and Mozambique. Part 5. Subfamily Taraninae." Annals of the Natal Museum 32.1 (1991): 325-339
 

Endemic fauna of South Africa
columbella
Gastropods described in 1991